Kalb Kandi (also Romanized as Kalb Kandī) is a village in Varqeh Rural District, in the Central District of Charuymaq County, East Azerbaijan Province, Iran. At the 2006 census, its population was 75, in 17 families.

References 

Populated places in Charuymaq County